Iphinopsis is a genus of sea snails, marine gastropod mollusks in the family Cancellariidae, the nutmeg snails.

Species
Species within the genus Iphinopsis include:
 Iphinopsis alba Bouchet & Warén, 1985
 Iphinopsis bathyalis (Okutani, 1964)
 Iphinopsis boucheti Okutani, Hashimoto & Sasaki, 2004
 Iphinopsis choshiensis (Habe, 1958)
 Iphinopsis fuscoapicata Bouchet & Warén, 1985
 Iphinopsis inflata (Friele, 1879)
 Iphinopsis kelseyi (Dall, 1908)
 Iphinopsis kulanda (Garrard, 1975)
 Iphinopsis nuda Dall, 1927
 Iphinopsis splendens Simone & Birman, 2006
 Iphinopsis traverseensis (A.H. Clarke, 1961)
Species brought into synonymy
 Iphinopsis euthymei (Barnard, 1960): synonym of Nothoadmete euthymei (Barnard, 1960)
 Iphinopsis kroyeri (Philippi, 1849): synonym of Neoiphinoe kroeyeri (Philippi, 1849)

References

 Habe T. (1958). Descriptions of ten new gastropod species. Venus. 20(1): 32-42

External links
 Bouchet, P. & Warén, A. (1985). Revision of the Northeast Atlantic bathyal and abyssal Neogastropoda excluding Turridae (Mollusca, Gastropoda). Bollettino Malacologico. supplement 1: 121-296
  Hemmen J. (2007) Recent Cancellariidae. Annotated and illustrated catalogue of Recent Cancellariidae. Privately published, Wiesbaden. 428 pp. [With amendments and corrections taken from Petit R.E. (2012) A critique of, and errata for, Recent Cancellariidae by Jens Hemmen, 2007. Conchologia Ingrata 9: 1-8

Cancellariidae